The Pentominium is a 122-storey,  supertall skyscraper on hold in Dubai, United Arab Emirates. Construction on the tower has been halted since August 2011. It was designed by Andrew Bromberg of architects Aedas and funded by Trident International Holdings. The AED 1.46 billion (US$400 million) construction contract was awarded to Arabian Construction Company (ACC).

Construction started on 26 July 2008 and, before construction stopped, the building was expected to be completed in 2013. By May 2011, 22 floors had been completed. However, in August 2011, construction stopped after Trident International Holdings fell behind on payments for a US$20.4 million loan following the global financial crisis. , the tower still stands incomplete.

Had the project been completed as scheduled, the Pentominium would have been the second tallest building in Dubai after Burj Khalifa and the tallest residential building in the world if completed before Central Park Tower.

Projected residential height
The Pentominium would have been the tallest all-residential building in the world instead of the Central Park Tower upon completion if construction had resumed; it has the highest projected height of any residential building under construction. It has been described as "one of the most architecturally significant projects in the city currently under construction" due to the "large number of offset cantilevered spa gardens and apartments down one side which create an imbalance for the building and, as a result, some fairly significant building sways which have to be corrected during construction."

The project management contract was awarded to the project management firm Precipio.

Apartments and design
The word "pentominium" is a portmanteau of the words "penthouse" and "condominium". Amenities available to residents would include a swimming pool, an observation deck, a private cinema, a health club and a banqueting hall, along with a cigar lounge and a business centre.

See also 
List of tallest buildings in Dubai
List of tallest residential buildings in Dubai
List of buildings with 100 floors or more

References

External links 

 
Construction Week

Residential skyscrapers in Dubai
Proposed buildings and structures in Dubai
Buildings and structures under construction in Dubai
Expressionist architecture
Futurist architecture
Architecture in Dubai
High-tech architecture
Andrew Bromberg buildings
Aedas buildings
Postmodern architecture